Stop Us If You've Heard This One Before Vol 1 is a covers album by British rock band The Wildhearts. It was released on 19 May 2008 on Round Records, originally as a twelve-track download. A fifteen-track CD was released on 7 July 2008.

This marks the first Wildhearts release where all four members of the band have taken lead vocals on different tracks.

Track listing 

Note: The tracks "AC Rocket," "Everyday Formula," and "The Judge" are not included in the legal download-only version of the album, or on the audio streaming service Spotify. The twelve tracks in the original download-only version of the album also appeared in a different order when downloaded automatically.

Personnel 
 Ginger – vocals, guitar
 Scott Sorry – vocals, bass
 Ritch Battersby – vocals, drums
 C. J. – vocals, guitar
 Jase Edwards – production

2008 albums
The Wildhearts albums
Covers albums